HM Trawler Force was a British trawler built for the Royal Navy in the First World War and subsequently requisitioned for service in the Second World War. She was sunk by air attack in June 1941.

Career
Force was built at Cochrane & Sons Shipbuilders Ltd at Selby in Yorkshire in 1917 (shipyard number 825), commissioned as the trawler James Bucham. She was an armed trawler built for the Royal Navy. She had a 3-cylinder triple expansion engine from C.D. Holmes of Hull. She was launched on 18 September 1917.

In 1922, after five years' service in the Royal Navy, she was sold to the City Steam Fishing Company Ltd of Kingston upon Hull and renamed as Stoneferry. She remained with them for twelve years and, in 1934, she was sold again and renamed. The new owners were the Hudson Fishing Company Ltd of Kingston upon Hull, who renamed her as Cape Tarifa. In 1938, she was sold to the Polish company Towarzystwo Dalekomorskich Połowów of Gdynia and again renamed, as Franciszka. After a year she returned to British ownership with the Adam Steam Fishing Company Ltd of Fleetwood, Lancashire, who renamed her Force.

World War II

In February 1940, after the outbreak of the Second World War, Force returned to the Royal Navy and was fitted with two 12 pounder  anti-aircraft guns.

The end came for Force off the north east Norfolk coast,  from Winterton Ness.

References
Tikus, Ayer (2004): The Ship-wrecks off North East Norfolk Pub: Ayer Tikus Publications, ISBN

External links
HMS Force

Naval trawlers of the United Kingdom
World War I naval ships of the United Kingdom
World War II naval ships of the United Kingdom
World War II merchant ships of the United Kingdom
Ships sunk by German aircraft
Steamships
World War II shipwrecks in the North Sea
1917 ships
Maritime incidents in June 1941
Ships built in Selby